Ano Panta is one of the two regions of Othoni island, near Corfu, Greece. It includes the western villages of the island (Chorio, Dafni, Stavros etc.) while Kato Panta covers the central and eastern part of Othoni.

References

Administrative regions of Greece
Geography of Greece